Friedrich Adolph Borsdorf (born Dittmansdorf, Saxony, 25 December 1854; died London, 15 April 1923), was a German player of the French horn.

Borsdorf was born in Saxony in 1854.  He studied the French horn at the Conservatoire in Dresden and played in a military band.  In 1879 he moved to England where he stayed for the rest of his life, becoming the most important horn player in England.  The conductor Hans Richter offered him a job in the orchestra at Covent Garden.  In 1904 he joined the newly formed London Symphony Orchestra.  The four horn players in that orchestra were excellent players and were often called “God’s Own Quartet”.

Borsdorf and his colleague Franz Paersch had learned to play on wide-bore horns that were made in Germany.  However, both changed to playing narrow-bore instruments made in France by Raoux.    Though not quite as powerful as the German models, they produced a particularly clear sound.

Borsdorf became a professor at the Royal College of Music when it was founded in 1882.  He also taught at the Royal Academy of Music.  He soon became the best horn player in London.  He was playing principal horn in the orchestra which Henry Wood conducted at the very first Promenade Concert in the Queen’s Hall in 1895 (the fourth horn was A. E. Brain Sr., grandfather of Dennis Brain).  He was also in the orchestra when Richard Strauss’s Till Eulenspiegel was given its first performance in England in 1896 with the composer conducting.

In 1913 he became ill and had to have teeth removed.  There was also another problem for him: World War I broke out in 1914 and there was a lot of anti-German feeling in England. After the war he rarely played in public.

Borsdorf died in 1923.  He had done more than anyone else to improve the standard of horn playing in England.  He taught many talented pupils, including A. E. Brain Jr., Aubrey Brain, Frank Probyn and his own three sons, Oskar, Francis and Emil, who all became professional horn players. The younger Borsdorfs changed their surname to Bradley because of anti-German sentiment; Oskar became (as Oscar Bradley) a successful composer and conductor for CBS. He died in 1948, aged 59. Francis stayed in London, retiring from the ENO orchestra in 1976.

References

1854 births
1923 deaths
German classical horn players
19th-century German musicians
20th-century German musicians
Academics of the Royal College of Music
Academics of the Royal Academy of Music
People from the Kingdom of Saxony